In game theory, an information set is a set for a particular player that, given what that player has observed, shows the decision vertices available to the player which are undistinguishable to them at the current point in the game. For a better idea on decision vertices, refer to Figure 1. If the game has perfect information, every information set contains only one member, namely the point actually reached at that stage of the game, since each player knows the exact mix of chance moves and player strategies up to the current point in the game. Otherwise, it is the case that some players cannot be sure exactly what has taken place so far in the game and what their position is.

Information sets are used in extensive form games and are often depicted in game trees. Game trees show the path from the start of a game and the subsequent paths that can be made depending on each player's next move. Information sets can be easily depicted in game trees to display each player's possible moves typically using dotted lines, circles or even by just labelling the vertices which shows a particular player's options at the current stage of the game as shown in Figure 1. 

More specifically, in the extensive form, an information set is a set of decision nodes such that:
 Every node in the set belongs to one player.
 When the game reaches the information set, the player with the move cannot differentiate between nodes within the information set, i.e. if the information set contains more than one node, the player to whom that set belongs does not know which node in the set has been reached.
Games in extensive form often involve each player being able to play multiple moves which results in the formation of multiple information sets as well. A player is to make choices at each of these vertices based on the options in the information set. This is known as the player's strategy and can provide the player's path from the start of the game, to the end which is also known as the play of the game. From the play of the game, the outcome will always be known based on the strategy of each player unless chance moves are involved, then there will not always be a singular outcome. Not all games play's are strategy based as they can also involve chance moves. When chance moves are involved, a vector of strategies can result in the probability distribution of the multiple outcomes of the games that could occur. Multiple outcomes of games can be created when chance is involved as the moves are likely to be different each time. However, based on the strength of the strategy, some outcomes could have higher probabilities than others. 

The notion of information set was introduced by John von Neumann, motivated by studying the game of Poker.

Example

At the right are two versions of the battle of the sexes game, shown in extensive form. Below, the normal form for both of these games is shown as well.

The second game is also sequential, but the dotted line shows player 2's information set. This is the common way to show that when player 2 moves, he or she is not aware of what player 1 did.

This difference also leads to different predictions for the two games. In the first game, player 1 has the upper hand. Formally, that's applying subgame perfection to solve the game.

In the second game, player 2 can't observe what player 1 did, so it might as well be a simultaneous game. So subgame perfection doesn't get us anything that Nash equilibrium can't get us, and we have the standard 3 possible equilibria:
 Both choose opera
 both choose football
 or both use a mixed strategy, with player 1 choosing O(pera) 3/5 of the time, and player 2 choosing  3/5 of the time

See also
 Self-confirming equilibrium

References
 

Game theory